Jagdish Tukaram Mulik is an Indian politician and member of the Bharatiya Janata Party. Mulik was a first term member of the Maharashtra Legislative Assembly in 2014 from the  Vadgaon Sheri constituency assembly constituency in Pune.
Sunil Tingre of NCP defeated Jagdish Mulik from Vadgaon Sheri constituency in the 2019 Maharashtra Legislative Assembly election.

References 

Politicians from Pune
Bharatiya Janata Party politicians from Maharashtra
Maharashtra MLAs 2014–2019
Living people
Marathi politicians
21st-century Indian women politicians
21st-century Indian politicians
Year of birth missing (living people)
Women members of the Maharashtra Legislative Assembly